Violeta Retamoza (born 20 July 1983) is a Mexican professional golfer who formerly played on the Futures Tour and on the LPGA Tour.

Amateur career highlights
Born and raised in Aguascalientes, Retamoza began playing golf at age eight.

 Semifinalist at the 2000 U.S. Girls' Junior.
 Seven-year member of the Mexico National Team.
 Recorded 15 top-10 finishes in collegiate competition, including four wins, while at the University of Tennessee.
 Three-time SEC All-Conference First Team selection (2003, 2004, 2005).
 Named the 2003 SEC Freshman of the Year.
 2003 NGCA All-American Second Team selection.
 2005 NGCA All-American First Team selection.
 Named the 2005 SEC Player of the Year.
 Participated in the two LPGA tournaments held in Mexico, the MasterCard Classic and the Corona Championship.

Professional career
Retamoza turned professional in December 2006. After failing to qualify for the LPGA via qualifying school, she joined the Duramed Futures Tour, and claimed her first professional win at the 2007 Alliance Bank Golf Classic, besides other three runner-up finishes.

She also participated in the MasterCard Classic on the LPGA Tour, where she made the cut finishing tied for 63rd; and the Corona Championship, where she missed the cut by two strokes. Both tournaments were held in her native Mexico.

In September 2007, Retamoza earned exempt status on the LPGA Tour for the 2008 season, by finishing fourth on the Duramed Futures Tour money list; the top five finishers earn such status. She also was named 2007 Futures Tour Rookie of the Year. In 2008, her rookie year on the LPGA Tour, she missed the cut in all except one of the 19 tournaments in which she played. She entered LPGA Qualifying School in the fall of 2008 to attempt to retain her playing privileges for 2009, but did not make the cut in the final qualifying tournament where she finished last among all competitors. She returned to the Futures Tour in 2009, where she competed in 24 events, making the cut in eight with a tournament best finish of T24.

She did not enter either the Futures Tour or LPGA Qualifying Tournaments in the fall of 2009 and is not a playing member of either tour in 2010.

Professional wins (1)

Futures Tour (1)
2007 (1) Alliance Bank Golf Classic

Career summary

References

External links

Biography on University of Tennessee golf team site

Mexican female golfers
LPGA Tour golfers
Tennessee Volunteers women's golfers
Sportspeople from Aguascalientes
1983 births
Living people